The canton of Saint-Pierre-le-Moûtier is an administrative division of the Nièvre department, central France. Its borders were modified at the French canton reorganisation which came into effect in March 2015. Its seat is in Saint-Pierre-le-Moûtier.

It consists of the following communes:
 
Avril-sur-Loire
Azy-le-Vif
Chantenay-Saint-Imbert
Chevenon
Dornes
Fleury-sur-Loire
Langeron
Livry
Luthenay-Uxeloup
Mars-sur-Allier
Neuville-lès-Decize
Saint-Parize-en-Viry
Saint-Parize-le-Châtel
Saint-Pierre-le-Moûtier
Toury-Lurcy
Toury-sur-Jour
Tresnay

References

Cantons of Nièvre